This is an incomplete list of Statutory Instruments of the United Kingdom in 1952. This listing is the complete, 29 items, "Partial Dataset" as listed on www.legislation.gov.uk (as at March 2014).

Statutory Instruments
The Trading with the Enemy (Authorisation) (Germany) Order 1952 SI 1952/4
The Trading with the Enemy (Transfer of Negotiable Instruments, etc.) (Germany) Order 1952 SI 1952/ 5
The Lands Tribunal (Statutory Undertakers Compensation Jurisdiction) Order 1952 SI 1952/161
The Reserve and Auxiliary Forces (Industrial Assurance and Friendly Societies) (Channel Islands) Order 1952 SI 1952/165
The Reserve and Auxiliary Forces (Industrial Assurance and Friendly Societies) (Isle of Man) Order 1952 SI 1952/166
The Distribution of German Enemy Property (No. 2) (Consolidated Amendment) Order 1952 SI 1952/633
The Double Taxation Relief (Taxes on Income) (Burma) Order 1952 SI 1952/751
The Japanese Treaty of Peace Order 1952 SI 1952/862
The Trading with the Enemy (Enemy Territory Cessation) (Belgium) Order 1952 SI 1952/880
The Superannuation (Fire Brigade and other Local Government Service) Interchange Rules 1952 SI 1952/936
The Superannuation (English Local Government and Northern Ireland) Interchange Rules 1952 SI 1952/937
The Veterinary Surgeons (University Degrees) (London) Order of Council 1952 SI 1952/959
The Official Secrets (Jersey) Order in Council 1952 SI 1952/1034
The Transferred Undertakings (Pensions of Employees) (No. 1) Regulations 1952 SI 1952/1159
The Double Taxation Relief (Taxes on Income) (Guernsey) Order 1952 SI 1952/1215
The Double Taxation Relief (Taxes on Income) (Jersey) Order 1952 SI 1952/1216
The Consular Conventions (Kingdom of Sweden) Order 1952 SI 1952/1218
The Coal Industry Nationalisation (Superannuation) Regulations 1952 SI 1952/1233
The Trading with the Enemy (Enemy Territory Cessation) (Indonesia) Order 1952 SI 1952/1246
The Cremation Regulations, 1952 SI 1952/1568
The Veterinary Surgeons (University Degrees) (Edinburgh) Order of Council 1952 SI 1952/1602
The Transferred Undertakings (Pensions of Employees) (No. 2) Regulations 1952 SI 1952/1612
British Transport Commission (Executives) Order 1952 SI 1952/1726
The Marriage (Authorised Persons) Regulations, 1952 SI 1952/1869
The Trading with the Enemy (Enemy Territory Cessation) (Denmark) Order 1952 SI 1952/2012
The Coal Industry (Superannuation Scheme) (Winding Up, No. 4) Regulations 1952 SI 1952/2018
The Wireless Telegraphy (Control of Interference from Ignition Apparatus) Regulations 1952 SI 1952/2023
The Trading with the Enemy (Enemy Territory Cessation) (Luxembourg) Order 1952 SI 1952/2067
The Carriage of Goods Coastwise Regulations 1952 SI 1952/2225

Unreferenced Listings
The following 4 items were previously listed on this article, however are unreferenced on the authorities site, included here for a "no loss" approach.
Barnsley Water Order 1952 SI 1952/531
Factories (Testing of Aircraft Engines and Accessories) Special Regulations 1952 SI 1952/1689
Wireless Telegraphy (Isle of Man) Order 1952 SI 1952/1899
Wireless Telegraphy (Channel Islands) Order 1952 SI 1952/1900

References

External links
Legislation.gov.uk delivered by the UK National Archive
UK SI's on legislation.gov.uk
UK Draft SI's on legislation.gov.uk

See also
List of Statutory Instruments of the United Kingdom

Lists of Statutory Instruments of the United Kingdom
Statutory Instruments